In some religions, an unclean animal is an animal whose consumption or handling is taboo. According to these religions, persons who handle such animals may need to ritually purify themselves to get rid of their uncleanliness.

Judaism

In Judaism, the concept of "impure animals" plays a prominent role in the Kashrut, the part of Jewish law that specifies which foods are allowed (kosher) or forbidden to Jews. These laws are based upon the Books of Leviticus and Deuteronomy of the Torah and in the extensive body of rabbinical commentaries (the Talmud). 

The concept of unclean animals is also mentioned in the Book of Genesis, when Noah is instructed to bring into the Ark all sorts "of pure beasts, and of beasts that are impure, and of fowls, and of every thing that creepeth upon the earth".

In the Torah, some animals are explicitly named as pure or impure, while others are classified by anatomical characteristics or other criteria. In some cases, there is some doubt as to the precise meaning of the Biblical Hebrew animal name.

According to Jewish dietary laws, to be "pure" an animal must also be free from certain defects and must be slaughtered and cleaned according to specific regulations (Shechita). 

Any product of an impure or improperly slaughtered animal is also non-kosher. Animal gelatin, for example, has been avoided, although recently kosher gelatin (from cows or from fish prepared according to kosher regulations) has become available.; the status of shellac is controversial. The prohibitions also extend to certain parts of pure animals, such as blood, certain fat tissues, and the sciatic nerves. 

Finally, it is forbidden to cook the meat of an animal in the milk or dairy product of that same animal, which has in turn led to the traditional practice of using separate complete sets of kitchen utensils for meat and dairy so as to totally ensure this rule is not broken.

Classification of animals

The Torah does not classify animals under modern scientific categories of mammals, fish, reptiles and birds. Rather, the religious categories are land-dwelling animals (land mammals, flightless birds, and land reptiles, etc.), flying animals (birds, insects, flying mammals such as bats), and given that each of these religious categories of animals includes species of at least two or more of each scientific categories of animals, there is no general kashrut rules relating per se to mammals, birds, reptiles, or fish. However, rules for each of these classes of animals can be extrapolated from the biblical requirements.

Mammals

According to the Torah, land-dwelling animals that both chew the cud (ruminate) and have cloven hooves, are kosher. 

By these requirements, any land-dwelling animal that is kosher can only possibly be a mammal, but even then, permitted are only those mammals that are placentals and strictly herbivorous (not omnivores nor carnivores) that both ruminate and also have cloven hooves, such as bovines (cattle/cows, bison, buffalos, yak, etc.), sheep, goats, deer, antelope, and technically, also giraffes.

Although the giraffe falls under the kosher category by its characteristics, it does not have a masorah (tradition) for its consumption by any Jewish community.

All other mammals, land-dwelling or otherwise, are forbidden by the Torah, including "crawling creatures" such as mice, and flying mammals such as the various species of bats. 

Water-bound mammals, such as whales, dolphins, seals, and dugongs, are also not kosher as they do not have the characteristics required of kosher water-bound creatures which must have both fins and scales.

Those land-dwelling mammals that have only one of the two characteristics of kosher land-dwellers (only ruminant or only cloven hooved) are impure and cannot be consumed. 

By default, therefore, not only are most land-dwelling mammals not kosher, but all land-dwelling non-mammals are also not kosher, including reptiles, amphibians, molluscs (including snails), etc.

Among mammals that Leviticus cites explicitly as an example of unclean is the camel, because it ruminates but does not have a cloven hoof; the hyrax and the hare are also explicitly given as examples of being excluded as kosher on the same grounds. Quintessentially, the Torah explicitly declares the pig unclean, because it has cloven hooves but does not ruminate.

Fish

By those requirements, kosher water creatures can only possibly be fish, but even then, permitted are only those fish that have both fins and scales.

All other non-fish water creatures are, by default, also not kosher, including amphibians, crustaceans, molluscs, water-bound mammals, water-bound reptiles, etc.

While there is nothing specifically mentioned in Jewish halakha requiring kosher fish having an endoskeleton ("inner skeleton") and gills (as opposed to lungs), every true fish that has both scales and fins by default also possesses an endoskeleton and gills. 

Any sea creature that lacks gills and can only breathe oxygen from air through lungs, or has an exoskeleton instead of an endoskeleton, is by default not kosher.

The definition of scales does not include the shells of prawns and shrimp, which are in fact the exoskeleton ("outer skeleton") of these animals, in the same manner as the shells of lobsters or crabs. Even if these shells were to be misidentified as scales, these creatures would still not be kosher as they lack fins.

While not every fish that has fins will have scales, every true fish that has true fish scales by default also has fins.

Birds
The Torah names only a few birds that may not be eaten; those not in the list are presumed to be kosher. However, the precise identity of the unclean birds is a matter of contention in traditional Jewish texts. It is therefore common to eat only birds with a clear masorah (tradition) of being kosher in at least one Jewish community, such as domestic fowl.

Leviticus 11 lists, among other things, the specifically non-kosher birds. The Hebrew names listed have been translated as follows:
 Cormorant
 Eagle
 Gull
 Hawk
 Heron
 Hoopoe
 Red and Black Kite
 Osprey
 Owl (Horned, Screech, Little, White, and Desert)
 Raven
 Stork
 Vulture and Black Vulture
Bats are also mentioned (though biologically, these are mammals rather than birds).

Insects

The Torah allows eating certain kinds of "winged swarming things" (e.g. insects) while prohibiting others. However, due to uncertainty about the Hebrew insect names, rabbis today recommend that all insects be considered unclean. 

An exception is made for certain locusts (Schistocerca gregaria), which are traditionally considered kosher by some Yemenite Jewish communities.

 details which insects are not to be eaten, and due to the wording all insects are considered impure to avoid mistaken consumption.

Bees' honey is considered kosher because the honey is not a product made of bees.

Explicit list

 Bat
 Camel
 Chameleon
 Coney (hyrax)
 Cormorant
 Cuckow (cuckoo)
 Eagle
 Ferret
 Frog
 Gier eagle
 Glede
 Great owl
 Hare
 Hawk
 Heron
 Kite
 Lapwing
 Little owl
 Lizard
 Mole
 Mouse
 Night hawk
 Osprey
 Ossifrage
 Owl
 Pelican
 Pig
 Raven
 Snail
 Stork
 Tortoise
 Vulture
 Weasel

Reasons
Some scholars have conjectured that the Jewish concept of "unclean animals" arose out of public health concerns by community leaders, since, in the conditions of the times, some of those animals are indeed more likely to cause food poisoning or transmit diseases to people who consume them.

British anthropologist Mary Douglas proposed that the "unclean" label had philosophical grounds, namely it was cast on foods that did not seem to fall neatly into any symbolic category. The pig, for example, was seen as an "ambiguous" creature, because it has cloven hooves like cattle, but does not chew cud.

Christianity

In the very early days of Christianity it was debated if converts ought to follow Jewish customs (including circumcision and dietary laws) or not. It was agreed that the converted gentiles would have to bear "no greater burden than these necessary things: that ye abstain from meats offered to idols, and from blood, and from things strangled, and from fornication".

While the majority of Christians agree that the dietary restrictions of the Old Testament were lifted with Christ's New Covenant, a view known as supersessionism, there are Torah-submissive Christians who believe that they should still be observed.

Some, like the Seventh Day Adventists, argue that the liberal view would imply the acceptance even of alcohol, tobacco, rats and roaches as "clean food"; and that God never declares something an abomination and then changes his mind.

Supporters of the stricter view have also disputed the interpretation of Peter's vision , claiming that God was merely instructing him not to refer to gentiles as "unclean" since salvation had been extended to them. This is expressly stated by Peter later in the chapter at Acts 10:28 ("but God hath shewed me that I should not call any man common or unclean.") In Acts 10:14 Peter makes a distinction between "common" (Greek κοινόν) and "unclean" (Greek ακάθαρτον) to which God replies in the next verse "What God hath cleansed, that call not thou common [κοίνου]".

One modern example of a Torah-submissive group is the Seventh-day Adventist Church, whose co-founder Ellen G. White was a proponent of vegetarianism. Many Seventh-day Adventists avoid meat for health reasons, although vegetarianism is not a requirement. Members of the United Church of God as well as other Sabbath-keeping Christian Churches also believe in abstaining from unclean meats.

Seventh-day Adventist 

Adventists are known for presenting a "health message" that advocates vegetarianism and expects adherence to the kosher laws, particularly the consumption of kosher foods described in Leviticus 11, meaning abstinence from pork, shellfish, and other animals proscribed as "unclean".

Ethiopian and Eritrean Orthodox Tewahedo Churches 
In both the Ethiopian and Eritrean Orthodox Tewahedo churches kosher diets are advocated for, and non-kosher diets are strictly forbidden in both the churches, meat coming from swine and non-kosher animals are restricted by both churches.

Islam

In Islam several animals are considered unclean and their consumption is sinful (harām), except in case of necessity; while others are permitted (halāl), as long as they are slaughtered in the proper manner and with blessings given to God.

The Quran expressly forbids consumption of "the flesh of swine" There are no other "impure animals" explicitly named in the Qur'an. If someone converts to Islam, Allah "allows them as lawful what is good and prohibits them from what is bad; he releases them from their heavy burdens and from the yokes that were upon them".

For other animals, great importance is given to the manner of its death: forbidden are blood and carrion ("dead meat"), and any animal that has been "killed by strangling, or by a violent blow, or by a headlong fall, or by being gored to death". Also forbidden is any animal that has been eaten by a wild animal, unless the person is able to slaughter it before it dies.

Finally, the Qur'an forbids food which has been invoked by a name other than Allah, which has been sacrificed on stone altars, or has been subjected to the pagan practice of raffling with arrows. Food slaughtered by an idolater is forbidden, but food that is acceptable to Jews and Christians is allowed to Muslims as well.

Dogs

According to the majority of Sunni scholars, dogs can be owned by farmers, hunters, and shepherds for the purpose of hunting and guarding and the Qur'an states that it is permissible to eat what trained dogs catch. Among the Bedouin, the saluki dogs are cherished as companions and allowed in the tents.

According to a Sunni Islam Hadith, a plate that a dog has used for feeding must be washed seven times, including once with clean sand mixed with the water, before a person may eat from it.

See also

 Clostridial necrotizing enteritis
 Food and drink prohibitions
 Islam and cats
 Religious restrictions on the consumption of pork
 Trichinosis

References

Further reading
 cited in

External links
 Laws of Judaism Concerning Ritual Purity and Cleanliness
 Laws of Islam Concerning Food

Animals in Judaism
Animals in Christianity
Animals in Islam
Animals in the Bible
Halal food
Kosher food
Religion-based diets
Ritual slaughter